The 2016 Clare Senior Hurling Championship was the 121st staging of the Clare Senior Hurling Championship since its establishment by the Clare County Board in 1887.

The defending champions and holders of the Canon Hamilton Cup were Sixmilebridge who won their second title in three years and to become county champions for a twelfth time.

Senior Championship Fixtures/Results

First round
 Eight winners advance to Round 2A (winners)
 Eight losers move to Round 2B (Losers)

Second round

A. Winners
 Played by eight winners of Round 1
 Four winners advance to Quarter-finals
 Four losers move to Round 3

B. Losers
 Played by eight losers of Round 1
 Four winners move to Round 3

Third round
 Played by four losers of Round 2A & four winners of Round 2B
 Four winners advance to Quarter-finals

Quarter-finals
 Played by four winners of Round 2A & four winners of Round 3

Semi-finals

County Final

Championship statistics

Miscellaneous
Ballyea win their first senior title.

References

External links

Clare Senior Hurling Championship
Clare Senior Hurling Championship